True Pole is a stereotypical ideal Polish person.

True Pole may also refer to:
True North Pole
True South Pole